Leukotriene-C4 hydrolase (gamma-glutamyl leukotrienase) is an enzyme. Gamma-glutamyltransferase 5 (GGT5) is a human gene which encodes an enzyme protein that belongs to this class of enzymes. This enzyme catalyses the following chemical reaction

 leukotriene C4 + H2O  leukotriene D4 + L-glutamate

The mouse enzyme is specific for leukotriene C4.

References

External links 
 

EC 3.4.19